The State Administration Council (abbreviated SAC or နစက) is the military junta currently governing Myanmar, established by Commander-in-Chief of Defence Services Min Aung Hlaing following the February 2021 coup d'état. The Council is chaired by Min Aung Hlaing. It has formed a provisional administration, also led by Min Aung Hlaing as Prime Minister of Myanmar.

The Committee Representing Pyidaungsu Hluttaw (CRPH) has designated the SAC as a "terrorist group," and SAC's legitimacy is contested by the competing National Unity Government of Myanmar (NUG).

History

Formation 
The State Administration Council was formed by Min Aung Hlaing on 2 February 2021 with 11 members in the aftermath of the 2021 Myanmar coup d'état. On 3 February, five civilian members were added to the Council. On 17 March, a civilian joined the council. On 30 March, a military officer and a civilian joined the council. As of late August , in total, the council comprises nine military officers and ten civilians.

In the leadup to and in the aftermath of the coup d'état, the military had made overtures to political parties allied with the Union Solidarity and Development Party (USDP), the military proxy party. On 14 August 2020, 34 pro-military parties including USDP had met with Min Aung Hlaing to seek assurances from the military to intervene in the event of electoral integrity issues during the upcoming 2020 Myanmar general election. Min Aung Hlaing's remarks during the meeting raised concerns that the military had threatened to stage a coup.

As of late August 2021, ten civilian members of the SAC include eight party's politicians, Sai Lone Saing and Shwe Kyein of the USDP, Mahn Nyein Maung of the Kayin People's Party (KPP), Thein Nyunt of the New National Democracy Party (NNDP), Khin Maung Swe of the National Democratic Force (NDF), Aye Nu Sein of the Arakan National Party (ANP), Banyar Aung Moe of the Mon Unity Party (MUP) and Saw Daniel, formerly of the Kayah State Democratic Party (KySDP). Khin Maung Swe and Thein Nyunt had co-founded NDF, a National League for Democracy (NLD) splinter group, while Mahn Nyein Maung was a former leader of the Karen National Union.

Several organisations have distanced themselves from civilian members of the SAC. Following Mahn Nyein Maung's appointment, the KNU distanced itself from him, and reiterated its opposition to the military coup. On 4 February, KySDP announced it had dismissed Saw Daniel from the party for accepting the appointment, and called for the Burmese military to honor the 2020 election results.

On 5 February, SAC formed a press team led by Brigadier-General Zaw Min Tun and deputy Thet Swe.

Sanctions
On 11 February, the United States government imposed sanctions on six military officers of the SAC, namely Min Aung Hlaing, Soe Win, Mya Tun Oo, Tin Aung San, Aung Lin Dwe, and Ye Win Oo. On the same day, Soe Htut, who later became a member of the SAC, was also sanctioned. On 22 February, the United States government imposed sanctions on two military officers, Maung Maung Kyaw and Moe Myint Tun. On 17 May and 2 July, the U.S. government imposed sanctions on four and three civilian members of the SAC, respectively. On 17 May, the United States government designated the SAC as an object to sanctions.

As of late August 2021, of all SAC members, only three civilians, Jeng Phang Naw Taung, Moung Har and Shwe Kyein, have not been sanctioned by the United States government.

Government reshuffle 
SAC has terminated numerous civil servants across multiple government bodies, including the Supreme Court, union-level ministries, the Naypyidaw Council, and Union Civil Service Board. It has quickly appointed replacements, including union ministers, mayors, agency executives, members of the Central Bank of Myanmar, Union Civil Service Board, judges, and Supreme Court justices. On 8 February, SAC appointed a new Constitutional Tribunal.

On 11 February, SAC formed State and Region Administration Councils and their leaders for Myanmar's 14 states and regions. It also appointed military officers to run Self-Administered Zone Councils for the country's autonomous zones.

Resistance and protests 

On 9 February, a 36-page draft cybersecurity law proposed by SAC was circulated to Myanmar's mobile operators and telecoms license holders for industry feedback. The draft bill would make internet providers accountable for preventing or removing content that "cause[s] hatred, destroy unity and tranquility" and would require ISPs to store user data at a government-prescribed location for a minimum of 3 years. A coalition of 150 civil service organizations publicly denounced the bill for violating the fundamental rights to freedom of expression, data protection, and privacy, and other democratic norms in the digital space, and for granting state authorities the ability to ban unfavorable content, restrict ISPs, and intercept data.

On 10 February, the SAC conducted late-night raids to arrest senior civilian politicians and election officials throughout the country, in an attempt to neutralize the NLD. High-profile arrests include the detentions of the Chief Ministers of Tanintharyi Region, Shan, Chin, Kachin, Karen and Rakhine States, as well as dozens of township- and district-level election officials.

On 11 February, SAC remitted the sentences of 23,314 prisoners. Among those released were supporters of the assassin who killed Ko Ni, the NLD's legal advisor. The Assistance Association for Political Prisoners expressed serious concern that the amnesty was intended to clear prison space in order to detain political prisoners. A recent spate of crimes, including arson, has coincided with the timing of the amnesty.

On 14 February, SAC amended existing privacy protection laws, which effectively enables the Commander-in-Chief to temporarily restrict or suspend the fundamental rights of citizens, including warrantless arrests and searches, until power is transferred to a newly elected government. SAC also enacted Law 3/2021, which requires all residents to register overnight guests outside of their official household with their respective township or ward administrators. The military era law had previously been repealed by the NLD-led government.

On 12 February, the Ministry of Information sent directives to the Myanmar Press Council, a media-adjudication and media-dispute settling body, that the media must report ethically and avoid instigating public unrest but the gradual resignation of twenty three out of twenty six members following the military coup has made it subjected to the cessation of functions. More distinctively, the directives say that the words "regime or junta" cannot be used for the State Administrative Council. Ten days after the directions of the Ministry of Information to the Press Council, Min Aung Hlaing, the military coup leader, threatened publications in Myanmar would lose their publishing licenses for the usage of the military regime or junta. Most local media said terms like "military council, junta or regime" will still be used in their reporting.

On 1 March, the CRPH designated the SAC as a "terrorist group".

Formation of caretaker government 
On 1 August, SAC was re-formed as a caretaker government and Min Aung Hlaing appointed himself as prime minister of that government. The same day, Min Aung Hlaing announced that the country's state of emergency had been extended by an additional 2 years, until elections were held.

Members
SAC's civilian members include politicians such as Phado Mahn Nyein Maung, a former member of the Karen National Union's Central Executive Committee; two former National League for Democracy (NLD) members; Thein Nyunt and Khin Maung Swe, co-founders of the National Democratic Force, a splinter group of the NLD; and Aye Nu Sein, vice-chair of the Arakan National Party.

The council members are:

Territorial control 
On 5 September 2022, the Special Advisory Council for Myanmar (SAC-M) reported that the junta has stable territorial control in 22% (72 of 330) of townships in Myanmar, comprising only 17% of Myanmar's land area. The report also noted that the regime's governance functions and administrative capacity were collapsing throughout the country, with much of Myanmar's townships now becoming contested territory, and resistance forces having effective territorial control in 39% of townships. Armed resistance has been most endemic in the Bamar heartland, particularly in Magwe and Sagaing Regions, as well as parts of Kachin, Kayin, Mon, and Rakhine States. On 7 September, NUG acting president Duwa Lashi La stated that the regime had lost control of half of the country, with the NUG having formed over 300 PDF battalions, and township public defence forces in 250 of the country's townships.

In November 2020, the Burmese military negotiated an informal ceasefire with the Arakan Army (AA), an insurgent group seeking autonomy for Rakhine State. The ceasefire enabled the military to redeploy allowing thousands of troops between January and early February 2021 to the country’s heartland, in the leadup and wake of the February coup. In this vacuum, the AA established its own governing institutions in Rakhine State, including in Rohingya-majority areas. In August 2021, the AA announced a parallel judicial system for state residents. By September 2021, the AA and its political wing, the United League of Arakan (ULA) effectively controlled 75% of the state's townships.

As of October 2021, over a hundred local SAC-appointed administrators in Sagaing, Magwe, and Yangon Regions have also resigned from their posts, following threats from People's Defence Force groups. Local administration offices have been used to strengthen the military's administrative power, revive neighbourhood surveillance networks, and enforce SAC mandates, including registration of household guests with local authorities.

Meetings 
By end of September 2021, the SAC meeting had been held 15 times. It is unclear what an ordinal number of the coordination meeting held on 15 February 2021 was. The SAC meetings reported by state-run English newspaper are as follows.

International recognition 
An increasing number of foreign governments have curbed diplomatic ties with the military-led government, following the coup. In February 2021, the Government of New Zealand officially announced it does not recognise the legitimacy of the military-led government, shortly after the coup. The Government of Japan does not recognize the military-led government as Myanmar's legitimate governing body. In August 2021, it refused to issue visas for 2 military-appointed diplomats intended to replace 2 Japan-based diplomats fired in March for protesting the coup.

Since the coup, ASEAN has been circumspect in avoiding the impression of giving de jure recognition to SAC in official and legal communications. Indonesia's foreign minister Retno Marsudi has led efforts to exclude SAC at the political level from all ASEAN meetings until democracy was restored through an inclusive process. In April 2021, ASEAN member states adopted a Five-Point Consensus with respect to the Myanmar situation, calling for the immediate cessation of violence in the country, commencement of constructive dialogue for a peaceful resolution, appointment of a special ASEAN envoy to mediate on ASEAN's behalf, the provision of humanitarian assistance via the AHA Centre, and ASEAN's ability to meet with all concerned parties.

On 4 October 2021, ASEAN leaders, including Indonesian foreign minister, Retno Marsudi, and Singaporean foreign minister, Vivian Balakrishnan, publicly expressed disappointment about the Burmese military's commitment to a peace plan. Malaysian Foreign Minister Saifuddin Abdullah expressed the possibility that the SAC chairman, Min Aung Hlaing and the junta could be excluded from the upcoming ASEAN Summit. ASEAN ultimately barred Min Aung Hlaing from attending the October summit. As of 1 November 2021, ASEAN's official website continues to list Kyaw Tin, appointed by the civilian-led government, as Myanmar's foreign minister, and civilian-appointed Win Myint as Myanmar's head of state.

As Myanmar's humanitarian situation has continued to decline after the coup, particularly with the execution of four political prisoners in July 2022, ASEAN member states have expressed dissatisfaction with the SAC for its intransigence in implementing ASEAN's Five-Point Consensus. In August 2022, Indonesia's foreign minister publicly criticized SAC's failure to implement the peace plan and its broken promises. In September 2022, Singapore's foreign minister expressed its disappointment in SAC's progress against the consensus. On 20 September 2022, Malaysia became the first ASEAN member state to publicly engage with the competing NUG.

In November 2022, the European Union instituted economic sanctions on the State Administration Council.

See also

2021 Myanmar coup d'état
Provisional Government of Myanmar
State Peace and Development Council, the military regime from 1988 to 2011

References

Government of Myanmar
Military dictatorship in Myanmar
Politicide perpetrators
Military history of Myanmar
2020s in Myanmar
2021 in military history
2021 establishments in Myanmar
Organizations based in Asia designated as terrorist
Provisional governments
Internal conflict in Myanmar
Specially Designated Nationals and Blocked Persons List
Entities related to Myanmar sanctions